The 2016 Canadian Junior Curling Championships were held from January 23 to 31 at the Stratford Rotary Complex. The winners represented Canada at the 2016 World Junior Curling Championships in Copenhagen, Denmark.

Men

Round-robin standings
Final round-robin standings

Championship pool standings
After Round-robin standings

Playoffs

Semifinal

Saturday, January 30, 19:00

Final
Sunday, January 31, 15:00

Women

Round-robin standings
Final round-robin standings

Championship pool standings
Final round-robin standings

Playoffs

Semifinal
Saturday, January 30, 14:00

Final
Sunday, January 31, 10:00

Qualification

The Junior Provincials were held January 6–10 at the Re/Max CC in St. John's (women's) and January 3–6 at the Corner Brook Curling Club in Corner Brook (men's). Junior Women's was a double round robin between the three teams qualified; Junior Men's was a single round robin. For the playoffs, the Junior Men's division had the top three teams advancing to the playoffs. The Junior Women's division had the top two teams advancing to the playoffs. If a team goes undefeated in the round robin, they must be beaten twice in the playoffs.

Results:

Men's tiebreaker: Trickett 9 - O'Neill 2
Men's tiebreaker: Smith 6 - Taylor 5
Men's quarter final: O'Neill 7 - Taylor 3
Men's semi final: Trickett 10 - O'Neill 4
Men's final: Smith 7 - Trickett 6
Women's final: Godsland 9 - Hill 8

The Mackie's NS Junior Provincials were held December 27–31 at the Lakeshore Curling Club in Sackville. The event is a modified triple knock-out qualifying three teams in a modified playoff.

Pre-Playoff Results:

Playoff results:

Men's semi final: Manuel 8 - Cocks 4
Men's final (N/A): Manuel vs Manuel
Women's semi final: Fay 9 - Ladouceur 1
Women's final (N/A): Fay vs Fay

The Pepsi PEI Provincial Junior Curling Championships were held December 27–30 at the Western Community Curling Club in Alberton.

The juniors will play a modified triple-knockout format, which will qualify three teams for a championship round.

Pre-Playoff results:

Playoff results:
Men's semi final: Smith 5 - MacFadyen 3
Men's final: MacLean 6 - Smith 3
Women's semi final (N/A): Fullerton vs Fullerton
Women's final (N/A): Fullerton vs Fullerton

The O'Leary Junior Provincial Championships are being held December 28–31 at the Riverside Country Club in Rothesay. The event is a modified triple knockout, qualifying three teams in a modified playoff.

Results:

Men's semi final: Smeltzer 6 - Robichaud 8
Men's final: MacCabe 5 - Robichaud 6
Women's semi final: Crook 1 - Comeau 8
Women's final: Crook 3 - Comeau 6

The Championnat Provincial Junior Brosse Performance are being held from January 4–8 at the Club de curling Montréal Ouest in Montréal.

The event is a round-robin with a modified playoff.

Men's semi final: Dion 4 - Roberge 9
Men's final: Asselin 9 - Roberge 5
Women's tiebreaker: Laurier 4 - Lavoie 7
Women's semi final: Jean 7 - Lavoie 6
Women's final: St-Georges 8 - Jean 6

The Pepsi Ontario Junior Curling Championships were held January 6–10 at the Mississaugua Golf & Country Club in Mississauga.

Results:

Men's semi final: Michaud 3 - Calwell 4
Men's final: Kee 10 - Calwell 3
Women's semi final: Marshall 6 - Murphy 5
Women's final: Auld 7 - Marshall 5

The Junior Provincial Championships are being held January 2–5 at the Kakabeka Falls CC (Men's) and Sioux Lookout CC (Women's).

Results:

Men's Tiebreaker A: Lemieux 6 - Roberts 4
Men's Tiebreaker B: Warkentin 4 - Fudge 7
Men's Tiebreaker C: Lemieux 9 - Fudge 3
Men's semi final: Vanderberg 11 - Lemieux 2
Men's final: Horgan 6 - Vanderberg 3
Women's Tiebreaker 1: Beaudry 9 - Daly 8
Women's Tiebreaker 2: Geaudry 10 - Beaudry 2
Women's semi final: Smith 8 - Geaudry 1
Women's final: Burns 4 - Smith 8

The Canola Junior Provincial Championships are being held January 6–11 at the Riverdale Community Centre in Rivers

Results:

Men's tiebreaker: Wiebe 3 - Oryniak 4
Men's B1 vs R1: Dunstone 7 - Ryan 2
Men's B2 vs R2: Oryniak 9 - Calvert 6
Men's semi final: Ryan 5 - Oryniak 7
Men's final: Dunstone 7 - Oryniak 4
Women's tiebreaker: Watling 8 - Lamb 5
Women's B1 vs R1: Zacharias 2 - Burtnyk 6
Women's B2 vs R2: Watling 7 - Ackland 8
Women's semi final: Zacharias 5 - Ackland 7
Women's final: Burtnyk 4 - Ackland 7

The Junior Provincial Championships are being held January 2–6 at the Nutana Curling Club in Saskatoon.

Men's Tiebreaker 1: Dlouhy 5 - Ackerman 4
Men's Tiebreaker 2: Springer 6 - Dlouhy 5
Men's A1 vs. B1: Hersikorn 8 - Kleiter 2
Men's A2 vs. B2: Springer 4 - Stewart 7
Men's semi final: Kleiter 5 - Stewart 4
Men's final: Hersikorn 5 - Kleiter 4
Women's Tiebreaker: Grabarczyk 3 - Williamson 7
Women's A1 vs. B1: Fesser 8 - Tokarz 5
Women's A2 vs. B2: Williamson 3 - Jones 6
Women's semi final: Tokarz 6 - Jones 5
Women's final: Fesser 8 - Tokarz 3

The Subway Junior Provincials are being held January 2–6 at the Wainwright Curling Club in Wainwright.

Results:

Men's semi final: Lautner 4 - Sturmay 6
Men's final: Harty 4 - Sturmay 7
Women's semi final: Streifel 5 - Skrlik 6
Women's final: Sturmay 6 - Skrlik 5

The Tim Horton's Junior Provincial Championships were held December 29–January 3 at the Kamlooops Curling Club in Kamloops.

Results:

Men's Tiebreaker 1: Love 7 - Carpenter 0
Men's Tiebreaker 2: Kiss 7 - Love 8
Men's 1 vs 2: Tardi 8 - Henderson 5
Men's 3 vs 4: McCrady 10 - Love 6
Men's Semi Final: Henderson 5 - McCrady 8
Men's Final: Tardi 8 - McCrady 3
Women's 1 vs 2: Brown 11 - Daniels 7
Women's 3 vs 4: Coulombe 6 - Loken 8
Women's Semi Final: Daniels 9 - Loken 4
Women's Final: Brown 3 - Daniels 11

Men: Brayden Klassen (Whitehorse)
Women: Alyssa Meger (Whitehorse)

Men: Matthew Miller (Inuvik)
Women: Zoey Walsh (Hay River)

Men: Arthur Siksik (Qavik)
Women: Sadie Pinksen (Iqaluit)

References

External links

Junior Championships
Canadian Junior Curling Championships, 2016
Sport in Stratford, Ontario
Canadian Junior Curling Championships
Canadian Junior Curling